The 1994 Fusagasugá City Council election in Fusagasugá, Colombia, was held on Sunday, 30 October 1994. According to Law 163 /94, elections of governors, mayors, deputies, town councilors, and aldermen or members of local administrative bodies, will be held on the last Sunday of October. At stake were all 15 seats in the City Council.

References 

1991
Regional elections